João Othavio Basso (born 13 January 1997) is a Brazilian footballer who plays for F.C. Arouca, as a defender.

References

External links

Brazilian footballers
1997 births
Living people
Primeira Liga players
Liga Portugal 2 players
Campeonato de Portugal (league) players
Paraná Clube players
G.D. Estoril Praia players
Real S.C. players
F.C. Arouca players
Association football defenders
Footballers from Curitiba